Zvenigovo (Provoj) is a town and the administrative center of Zvenigovsky District of the Mari El Republic, Russia, located on the left bank of the Volga River,  south of Yoshkar-Ola, the capital of the republic. As of the 2010 Census, its population was 11,946.

History
It was founded in 1860 and granted urban-type settlement status in 1927 and town status in 1974.

Administrative and municipal status
Within the framework of administrative divisions, Zvenigovo serves as the administrative center of Zvenigovsky District. As an administrative division, it is, together with one rural locality (the village of Chuvash-Otary), incorporated within Zvenigovsky District as the town of district significance of Zvenigovo. As a municipal division, the town of district significance of Zvenigovo is incorporated within Zvenigovsky Municipal District as Zvenigovo Urban Settlement.

References

Notes

Sources

External links
Official website of Zvenigovo 
Zvenigovo Business Directory  

Cities and towns in Mari El
Populated places on the Volga
Populated places established in 1860